Jennifer Lynn Conlee-Drizos (born December 12, 1971) is an American musician, best known as the accordionist, pianist, organist, keyboardist, melodica player, and occasional backup singer and harmonicist for the indie rock quintet The Decemberists.

Musical career
Aside from her work with the Decemberists, Conlee has made guest appearances on several records by other artists, including Hush Records artist Reclinerland, Lewi Longmire, Jerry Joseph, Buoy LaRue and many others.  Before the Decemberists, she played piano for the 1990s Portland, Oregon, band Calobo. She is also a member of Portland-based Casey Neill & The Norway Rats where she plays keyboards, accordion, and glockenspiel. Her most recent project is the acoustic band Black Prairie, in which she plays with a number of other Portland artists. She also founded the band KMRIA (Kiss My Royal Irish Arse), a The Pogues cover band.

Conlee's accordions include a Paolo Soprani, which was on display at the Rock and Roll Hall of Fame and a Petosa Futura, which she described as her "regular axe".

Television
In 2011, she appeared on Portlandia in comedic skits with Fred Armisen and Carrie Brownstein.  She played a musician who unsuccessfully tries to play at every venue at Blunderbuss, a fictional citywide Portland, Oregon festival, as a member of the band Sparkle Pony, and is turned away as she is not on the line up of any of them.

She also appeared on Parks and Recreation when The Decemberists performed at the Unity Concert.

Personal life
She is married to drummer Steve Drizos.  
In May 2011, Conlee was diagnosed with breast cancer.  Colin Meloy said that a full recovery was likely, but that she would miss some concerts. On October 20, 2011, Meloy announced via his Twitter that Conlee's cancer was in remission.

References

External links
 
 Casey Neill & The Norway Rats website

Living people
American accordionists
American rock keyboardists
American rock pianists
American women pianists
Musicians from Portland, Oregon
Musicians from Seattle
1971 births
The Decemberists members
Black Prairie members
21st-century accordionists
21st-century American women musicians